Trembita is a 1968 Soviet comedy film directed by Oleg Nikolayevsky.

Plot 
The film takes place after the war. The film tells about the former butler of a count who returns to his native village with the hope of finding a treasure and taking possession of it.

Cast 
 Yevgeny Vesnik as Bogdan Susik
 Olga Aroseva as Parasya (voiced by Glikeriya Bogdanova-Chesnokova)
 Aleksey Chernov as Atanas
 Nikolay Trofimov as Shik
 Lyudmila Kupina as Vasilina
 Boris Savchenko as Alexey
 Yulia Vukkert as Olesya
 Anatoli Galevsky as Mikola
 Ivan Pereverzev as Prokop, Mikola's father
 Savely Kramarov as Petro

References

External links 
 

1968 films
1960s Russian-language films
Soviet comedy films
1968 comedy films
Soviet musical comedy films
Films set in the Soviet Union